Patria Anne Hume is a New Zealand sports biomechanics academic. She is currently a full-time Professor of Human Performance at the Auckland University of Technology Sport Performance Research Institute New Zealand (SPRINZ) at AUT Millennium.

Hume represented New Zealand in rhythmic gymnastics for six years, before coaching gymnasts who won medals at the 1990 Commonwealth Games. She is a Fellow of the Royal Society Te Apārangi.

Academic career
Professor Patria Hume studied at the University of Otago in Biomechanics, MSc (Hons) with a double major in Sports Physiology and Sports Psychology University of Auckland, BSc with a double major in Physiology and Psychology University of Auckland, Postgraduate Certificate in Epidemiology (Rollins School of Public Health), Criterion Certification in Anthropometry (ISAK level 4), and ISAK Certification in Photoscopic Anthropometry. 2002 International Olympic Committee Diploma in Sport. Post doctorate studies from 1994 to 1996 were in sports injury biomechanics and sports injury prevention and were conducted at the University of Calgary with Professor Benno Nigg, in Zurich at ETHZ with Dr Alex Stacoff and at the University of Wollongong with Professor Julie Steele. Hume's biomechanics mentors have been Professor Barry Wilson (Otago), Professor James Hay (USA) and Professor Benno Nigg (Canada), with career mentors AUT Vice Chancellor Derek McCormack (NZ), and merchant banker Lex Henry (NZ). Her 1999 PhD thesis was titled Effects of the Aircast ankle brace on the ankle during inversion movement.  Hume became full Professor in 2007 at the Auckland University of Technology. after starting there in 1999. Previous employment was at The University of Auckland and The University of Otago.

Hume's work on head injuries in rugby has been covered extensively in the press.

Awards 
In March 2021, Hume was created a Fellow of the Royal Society Te Apārangi, recognising that her research has "helped transform concussion injury awareness and management in New Zealand and internationally".

Selected works 
 King, D., Hume, P. A., Cummins, C., Foskett, A., & Barnes, M. J. (2020). Changes in the stress and recovery of injured versus non-injured amateur domestic women's rugby union team players over a competition season in New Zealand. New Zealand Journal of Sports Medicine, 46(2).
 McGeown, J., Kara, S., Crosswell, H., Borotkanics, R., Hume, P. A., Quarrie, K., & Theadom, A. (2019). Predicting sport-originated brain injury recovery trajectory using initial clinical assessment findings: a retrospective cohort study. Sports Medicine. https://doi.org/doi.org/10.1007/s40279-019-01240-4
 King, D., Hume, P. A., Gissane, C., & Clark, T. (2017). Semi-professional rugby league players have higher concussion risk than professional or amateur participants: A pooled analysis. Sports Medicine, 47(2), 197–205. https://doi.org/10.1007/s40279-016-0576-z
 Pearson, S. N., Hume, P. A., Cronin, J. B., & Slyfield, D. (2016). America's Cup sailing: Effect of standing arm-cranking (‘grinding’) direction on muscle activity, kinematics, and torque application. Sports, 4(3), 12. https://doi.org/10.3390/sports4030037
 Hewit, J. K., Cronin, J. B., & Hume, P. A. (2012). Asymmetry in multi-directional jumping tasks. Physical Therapy in Sport, 13(4), 238–242.
 Bradshaw, E., & Hume, P. A. (2012). Biomechanical approaches to identify and quantify injury mechanisms and risk factors in women's artistic gymnastics. Sports Biomechanics, 11(3), 324–341. https://doi.org/10.1080/14763141.2011.650186
 Hume, P. A., Hopkins, W. G., Robinson, D. M., Robinson, S. M., & Hollings, S. C. (1993). Predictors of attainment in rhythmic sportive gymnastics. Journal of Sports Medicine and Physical Fitness, 33(4), 367–377.
 Hume, P. A. (1993). Netball injuries in New Zealand. New Zealand Journal of Sports Medicine, 21(2), 27–31.
 Hopkins, W. G., Hume, P. A., Robinson, D. M., & Robinson, S. M. (1991). Training intensity of elite male distance runners. Medicine and Science in Sports and Exercise, 23(9), 1078–1082.

References

External links
 
 
 
 
 

Date of birth missing (living people)
Living people
New Zealand women academics
New Zealand gymnasts
New Zealand sports coaches
University of Otago alumni
Academic staff of the University of Auckland
Academic staff of the Auckland University of Technology
Biomechanics
Sports scientists
1966 births
Fellows of the Royal Society of New Zealand